The following is a list of episodes of the American sitcom Amen, which aired from September 27, 1986, until May 11, 1991, on NBC. 110 episodes have aired over five seasons.

Series overview

Episodes

Season 1 (1986–87)

Season 2 (1987–88)

Season 3 (1988–89)

Season 4 (1989–90)

Season 5 (1990–91)

References

External links

Lists of American sitcom episodes